Lebohang Kgosana Maboe (born 17 September 1994) is a South African professional soccer player who plays as an attacking midfielder or forward for South African Premier Division club Mamelodi Sundowns and the South African national team. He is the son of former Moroka Swallows and Orlando Pirates player Sidwell Maboe.

Club career

Early career
The son of former professional footballer, Sidwell, Maboe began playing football in his home town of Heidelberg where he played with amateur side Ratanda Real Hearts. During his time with Hearts, he was promoted to the club's under-17 side at the age of 14 where his performances at age-group level earned him the opportunity to later join the Kaizer Chiefs academy.

Mbombela United
In 2015, Maboe signed for National First Division side Mbombela United where he spent a solitary season. He recorded a return of 3 goals in 27 league appearances to help the club reach the PSL play-offs where they were defeated by Highlands Park. Maboe would advance to the PSL, however, as at the conclusion of the season he was signed by top-flight side, Maritzburg United.

Maritzburg United

Maboe officially joined Maritzburg United in July 2016 where he initially joined up with the club's reserve side. He was then promoted to the first team by coach Ernst Middendorp who handed him his debut in October against Free State Stars. He faced challenging circumstances at the club following Middendorp and his replacement Roger de Sa's respective resignations, but nonetheless enjoyed a strong debut season. During the latter parts of the campaign he played in every match under new coach Fadlu Davids and recorded 3 goals in 22 appearances in total.

Maboe's form continued to improve the following season, particularly in the Nedbank Cup where he helped the club to a runners-up finish against Free State Stars. His performances in the tournament earned him the Player of the Tournament and Most Promising Player awards. However, at the end of the season, and with Maritzburg United facing financial difficulties, he was sold to league rivals, Mamelodi Sundowns.

Mamelodi Sundowns
On the opening day of the season, Maboe was handed his debut off the bench by Pitso Mosimane in a 1–1 draw with Kaizer Chiefs. In the next match, he scored his first goal for the club in a 2–0 win over Polokwane City. He ultimately scored nine goals and recorded eight assists as Sundowns retained the PSL title.

International career

South Africa

Following his success with Maritzburg United, Maboe received his first international call-up to the senior national team ahead of the 2017 COSAFA Cup. The following year, he returned for the 2018 edition of the competition where he scored three goals in two appearances as South Africa went on to lift the Plate title; equivalent of a fifth-placed finish.

Career statistics

International

Honours and awards
Club
Mamelodi Sundowns
 South African Premier Division: 2018–19, 2019-20
 Nedbank Cup: 2019-20
 Telkom Knockout: 2019
Individual
 Nedbank Cup Player of the Tournament: 2018
 Nedbank Cup Most Promising Player: 2018

References
Notes

Citations

1994 births
Living people
South African soccer players
Association football midfielders
Maritzburg United F.C. players
Mamelodi Sundowns F.C. players
South African Premier Division players
South Africa international soccer players
Mbombela United F.C. players
2019 Africa Cup of Nations players